Mirabello Monferrato is a comune (municipality) in the Province of Alessandria in the Italian region of Piedmont, located about  east of Turin and about  northwest of Alessandria.

Mirabello Monferrato borders the following municipalities: Giarole, Lu e Cuccaro Monferrato, Occimiano, San Salvatore Monferrato, and Valenza.

References

Cities and towns in Piedmont